The 1986 Virginia Slims of Florida, also known as the VS of Florida, was a women's tennis tournament played on outdoor hard courts in Key Biscayne, Florida in the United States that was part of the 1985 Virginia Slims World Championship Series. It was the eighth edition of the tournament and was held from January 27 through February 2, 1986. First-seeded Chris Evert-Lloyd won the singles title, her third consecutive at the event.

Finals

Singles

 Chris Evert Lloyd defeated  Steffi Graf 6–3, 6–1
 It was Evert-Lloyd's 1st singles title of the year and the 143rd of her career.

Doubles

 Kathy Jordan /  Elizabeth Smylie defeated  Betsy Nagelsen /  Barbara Potter 7–6, 2–6, 6–2

Notes

References

External links
 ITF tournament edition details
 Tournament draws

Virginia Slims of Florida
Virginia Slims Of Florida, 1986
Virginia Slims of Florida
Virginia Slims of Florida
Virginia Slims of Florida
Virginia Slims of Florida